The Space Superiority Systems Directorate at Los Angeles Air Force Base includes the "Space Situational Awareness Group" and the "Counterspace Group".

Mission
Their mission is to "develop, deliver, and sustain"  capabilities that "ensure space superiority" for the United States. "The visible sensor on the SBSS satellite will be used to provide critical information vital to the protection of US military and civilian satellites," said Lt Col Robert Erickson, squadron commander for Space Based Space Surveillance within the Space Superiority Systems Wing.

History
The Air Force has proposed to cut in half funding for Counterspace and Space Control programs in its 2011 budget request, while increasing the budget for space tracking.

Squadrons assigned

Bases stationed
 Los Angeles AFB, California

List of directors
Col Arnold H. Streland
Col Mark Baird, July 2012 – September 2014
Col Philip A. Garrant, May 2014 – June 2017
Col Stephen G. Purdy Jr., August 2, 2017 – March 2020

References

External links
 SSSW Fact Sheet

Military units and formations in California
Units and formations of the United States Space Force